Moon Tae-jong (or Cameron Jarod Stevenson; born December 1, 1975) is a South Korean former professional basketball player at the small forward position. He is 1.99 m in height. Moon played at the 2011 FIBA Asia Championship games, representing South Korea. He is currently head basketball coach at Seaforth High School in Pittsboro, North Carolina.

College career
Moon played college basketball at the University of Richmond, with the Richmond Spiders, from 1994–1998 and he was named Colonial Athletic Association Player of the Year in 1998. He led the Richmond Spiders to an upset of the #3 seeded South Carolina Gamecocks in the NCAA tournament the same year.

Professional career
Moon was named the 1999 French Cup Finals MVP, and he also played in the 2006 FIBA EuroChallenge All-Star Game.

National team career
Moon was a member of the senior South Korean national team. He won the bronze medal at the 2011 FIBA Asia Championship, and the gold medal at the 2014 Asian Games. He also played at the 2014 FIBA World Cup.

Awards and honors
As awarded by the basketball website Eurobasket.com:
CAAC Player of the Year -98
French Cup Finalist -99
French Cup Finals MVP -99
French Pro B MVP -99
French ProA All-Import Players 2nd Team -00
Israeli Cup Final Four -03
All-Israeli League 2nd Team -03, 04
Israeli Premier League Semifinals -04
Israeli League All-Imports 1st Team -04
FIBA Europe Cup North Conference Finalist -05
FIBA Europe Cup Finalist -05
FIBA Europe Cup Final Four All-Star Team -05
FIBA EuroCup All-Star Game -06 (3-Points Contest Winner)
Turkish Cup Semifinals -06
ULEB Cup Semifinals -07
Russian Cup Finalist -07
Russian A Superleague Regular Season Runner-Up -07
Russian A Superleague Finalist -07
Russian A Superleague All-Newcomers Team -07
Greek League Semifinals -08, 09
All-Greek League Forward of the Year -08
All-Greek League 1st Team -08
Greek A1 League All-Imports Team -08
Greek Cup Semifinals -09
All-Greek A1 League Forward of the Year -09
All-Greek A1 League 1st Team -09
Greek A1 League All-Imports Team -09
Adriatic League Semifinals -10
Korean KBL Regular Season Runner-Up -11
Korean KBL Semifinals -11
All-Korean KBL Forward of the Year -11
All-Korean KBL 1st Team -11
Korean KBL All-Domestic Players Team -11

Personal life
Moon earned his South Korean citizenship in 2011, alongside his brother, Moon Tae-young (born Greg Stevenson), who was also a professional basketball player. The Moon brothers were born to their Korean mother and African American father. His son, Jarin Stevenson, plays for him at Seaforth High School.

See also
 List of foreign basketball players in Serbia

References

External links
 EuroCup Profile
 Eurobasket.com Profile
 Turkish League Profile
 Profile at KBL.or.kr
 
 

1975 births
Living people
2014 FIBA Basketball World Cup players
American expatriate basketball people in France
American expatriate basketball people in Greece
American expatriate basketball people in Israel
American expatriate basketball people in Italy
American expatriate basketball people in Russia
American expatriate basketball people in Serbia
American expatriate basketball people in Spain
American expatriate basketball people in Turkey
American men's basketball coaches
American men's basketball players
American sportspeople of Korean descent
Asian Games bronze medalists for South Korea
Asian Games gold medalists for South Korea
Asian Games medalists in basketball
Basketball coaches from North Carolina
Basketball players at the 2014 Asian Games
Basketball players from North Carolina
Basketball players from Seoul
BC UNICS players
Bnei HaSharon players
Bnei Hertzeliya basketball players
CB Girona players
Changwon LG Sakers players
Cholet Basket players
Connecticut Pride players
Daegu KOGAS Pegasus players
Fenerbahçe men's basketball players
High school basketball coaches in North Carolina
Israeli Basketball Premier League players
KK Hemofarm players
Korean Basketball League players
Liga ACB players
Maroussi B.C. players
Medalists at the 2014 Asian Games
Richmond Spiders men's basketball players
SIG Basket players
Small forwards
South Korean expatriate basketball people in France
South Korean expatriate basketball people in Russia
South Korean expatriate basketball people in Serbia
South Korean expatriate basketball people in Spain
South Korean expatriate basketball people in Turkey
South Korean men's basketball players
South Korean people of African-American descent
Sportspeople from Fayetteville, North Carolina